Tarcal is a village on the eastern edge of Borsod-Abaúj-Zemplén county, northern Hungary, in the famous Tokaj-Hegyalja wine district,  from Miskolc.

Geography 

Tarcal is probably the best grape-growing locale of the world famous Tokaj-Hegyalja wine district. All the traditional Tokaji grape varieties (Furmint, Hárslevelű, Sárga Muskotály (Yellow muscat) grown here dry well on the vine, so they are suitable for excellent vintage wines, special quality Szamorodni wines, and 3-to-6 Puttonyos Tokaji aszú wines. These wines are seasoned in oakwood casks in cellars covered with choice mould (racodium cellare, a noble cellar mould).

History 
The estate was presented to Captain Turzul by Árpád at the time of the Conquest.

In 1941 the population of Tarcal was 4004.

During deportations to the USSR in 1945 the local priest János Szerednyei voluntarily agreed to join a group of Tarcal inhabitants rounded up for deportations. He was sent to a labour camp in Vorosilovka, a part of the gulag. Szerednyei died in a coal mine accident in 1948.

In 2015 an 8.5-meter statue of Jezus was displayed on a hill above the village. The sculptor was Sándor Szabó.

Jewish community 
The Jewish population in Tarcal was 299 in 1941. Most of the Tarcal Jews were murdered in the Holocaust in 1944. In 1946 only 30 Jews lived in Tarcal.

Among the famous rabbis of Tarcal were:
 Rabbi Yitzchak Isaac Taub, the first Hasidic Rebbe in Hungary. He later relocated to Nagykálló and remains famous as the Kaliv Rebbe. 
 Rabbi Yechezkel Paneth (1813–1822), author of Mare Yeheskel (Marmaros, 1875).
 Rabbi Chayim Yosef Gottlieb (born Tarcal, 1790). In 1823 he was appointed dayan and teacher in Tarcal.
 Rabbi Yaakov Shapira (1876–1906), a famous scholar, often mentioned in the halachic responsa of the famous rabbis of Hungary.
 Rabbi Yehoshua Heshil Rosner (1906–1944). He was the son-in-law of Rabbi Yaakov Shapira. Rabbi Rosner was murdered in the Holocaust in 1944.

Sights of Tarcal 
The architectural sights of the village are mostly connected to the Rákóczi family. The mansions called King court, Rákóczi tavern and Sebeö mansion got their present form at the end of the 18th century.

The Roman Catholic church is from 1615. Its foundations, crypt and the bottom part of the tower are of medieval origin. The Calvinist church, where a memorial tablet commemorates the Reformed Confession, which was created here by the Tarcal Council in 1564, and the oval planned Terézia chapel were built between 1770 and 1790. The renovated synagogue was built around 1800.

Another interesting sight of Tarcal may be the Andrássy Manor, which was built in baroque style in the 16th century. Under the mansion, owned by the Andrássy family for several decades, there is a hidden cellar mainly used for producing and storing wine.

Images

Notes

References 
 
 
 Street map 

Populated places in Borsod-Abaúj-Zemplén County